László Arany (born 9 March 1971) is a retired Hungarian football midfielder.

References

1971 births
Living people
Hungarian footballers
FC Tatabánya players
Keszthely FC footballers
Debreceni VSC players
Ferencvárosi TC footballers
Budapest Honvéd FC players
Zalaegerszegi TE players
Nyíregyháza Spartacus FC players
Association football midfielders
Hungary international footballers